Trapp is a surname. Notable people with the surname include:

 A. A. Trapp (1918–2007), Manitoba politician
 Albert Trapp (died 1953), Manitoba politician
 James Trapp (born 1969), American former sprinter and American football player
 John Trapp (1601–1669), English Anglican Bible commentator
 John Q. Trapp (born 1945), American basketball player
 J. B. Trapp (1925–2005), English historian 
 Joseph Trapp (1679–1747), English academic and cleric 
 Kevin Trapp (born 1990), German football goalkeeper
 Martin E. Trapp (1877–1951), Oklahoma politician
 Petr Trapp (born 1985), Czech footballer
 Wil Trapp (born 1993), American professional soccer player
 Wilhelm Trapp (1889–1948), German Nazi policeman, executed for war crimes

von Trapp family of Austria & America; An Austrian noble family immortalized in the stage musical and film The Sound of Music   
 Georg von Trapp (1880–1947), naval officer and head of the family 
 Hede von Trapp (1877–1947), Austrian painter and poet, sister of Georg
 Maria von Trapp (1905–1987), stepmother and matriarch of the Trapp Family Singers
 Rupert von Trapp (1911–1992), member of the Trapp Family Singers
 Maria F. von Trapp (1914–2014), member of the Trapp Family Singers
 Werner von Trapp (1915–2007), member of the Trapp Family Singers
 Elisabeth von Trapp (born 1955), folk singer, daughter of Werner and granddaughter of Georg and Agatha von Trapp
 Hedwig von Trapp (1917–1972), member of the Trapp Family Singers
 Johanna von Trapp (1919–1994), member of the Trapp Family Singers
 Martina von Trapp (1921–1951), member of the Trapp Family Singers
 Lilian von Trapp (born 1987), German jewellery designer

Fictional characters:

 Captain Edward Trapp, a fictional hero of Brian Callison's 4-book series

See also
 Trapp, Carmarthenshire, village in south-west Wales
 Trapp, Kentucky, an unincorporated community
 Trapp, Virginia, an unincorporated community
 Trapp basalts, or flood basalt, rock formation phenomenon
 Trapp Family Austrian Relief Inc.

Occupational surnames
Surnames from nicknames
English-language occupational surnames